India  competed at the 2019 World Aquatics Championships in Gwangju, South Korea from 12 to 28 July.

Diving

India entered one diver.

Men

Open water swimming

India qualified two male and two female open water swimmers.

Men

Women

Swimming

India entered seven swimmers.

Men

References

World Aquatics Championships
2019
Nations at the 2019 World Aquatics Championships